Viktoriya Viktorivna Tkachuk (born 8 November 1994) is a Ukrainian athlete specialising in the 400 metres hurdles. She won the silver medal in the event at the 2022 European Athletics Championships.

Tkachuk represented Ukraine at the 2016 Rio Olympics without advancing from the semi-finals, and at the 2020 Tokyo Olympics, where she placed sixth in the final.

Her personal best in the 400 metres hurdles is 53.76 seconds, set in 2021 in Zürich.

International competitions

References

External links
 

1994 births
Living people
Ukrainian female hurdlers
World Athletics Championships athletes for Ukraine
Athletes (track and field) at the 2016 Summer Olympics
Olympic athletes of Ukraine
Athletes (track and field) at the 2020 Summer Olympics
Sportspeople from Khmelnytskyi Oblast
European Athletics Championships medalists